Växjö is a city and the seat of Växjö Municipality, Kronoberg County, Sweden. It had 70,489 inhabitants (2019) out of a municipal population of 95,995 (2021). It is the administrative, cultural, and industrial centre of Kronoberg County and the episcopal see of the Diocese of Växjö and the location of Växjö Cathedral. The town is home to Linnaeus University.

Etymology 

History 
In contrast to what was believed a century ago, there is no evidence of a special pre-Christian significance of the site. The pagan cultic center of Värend may have been located at Hov, a nearby village.

An episcopal see since the 11thcentury, the city did not get its city charter until 1342, when it was issued by Magnus Eriksson. The cathedral of St Sigfrid dates from about 1300, and has been subsequently restored. Otherwise, during the Middle Ages, Växjö did not have many pious institutions. A Franciscan monastery was established in 1485. A hospital of the Holy Ghost was first mentioned in 1318. In the 14th century Växjö got its first school, Växjö katedralskola. In 1643 it received gymnasium status.

At the beginning of Gustav Eriksson's war of liberation, the peasantry joined forces, under the guidance of the union-hostile bishop Ingemar Pedersson, with the mountain men and peasantry of Dalarna, Hälsingland, and Gästrikland, who urged fidelity to their leader Gustav Eriksson. During the Dacke War, a peasant uprising, the city was under the authority of Nils Dacke and his supporters from the summer of 1542 until after New Year 1543.

Several times during the Northern Wars and the Scanian Wars, and thereafter, the city was affected by fire (in 1277, 1516, 1570, 1612, 1658, 1690, 1749, 1753, 1799, 1838 and 1843). After the last fire in 1843, when 1,140 citizens were rendered homeless, Växjö received its current street plan.

Modern times
The Barbarella nightclub was opened in the 1970s.

In its December 2015 report, Police in Sweden placed the Växjö district Araby in the most severe category of urban areas with high crime rates. During 2015 Växjö suffered a series of arson incidents.

Historic buildings 

Växjö Cathedral is located near the centre of the city.

Immediately north of Växjö is Kronoberg Castle, a ruined fortress constructed in the 15th century. This castle was used as a base by the rebel, Nils Dacke, during the Dacke War. The fortress has thick walls and artillery portals that face north towards lake Helgasjön.

Teleborg Castle is also located near the city. It was built near the Linnaeus University in 1900, it now functions as a hotel and conference facility.

Amenities
The Swedish Emigrant Institute was established in 1965 and is housed in the House of Emigrants near Växjö Lake in the heart of the city. It contains archives, a library, a museum, and a research center relating to the emigration period between 1846 and 1930, when 1.3million (or 20%) of the Swedish population emigrated, mainly to the United States. Archives dating to the 17thcentury contain birth and death records, as well as household records, that are available on microfiche.

Industry
Industries include GE Power and Aerotech Telub, as well as Volvo Articulated Haulers which is located in Braås , north of Växjö. One of the best-known service providers is Fortnox and Visma. Växjö houses Sweden's National Glass Museum and claims to be the capital of the "Kingdom of Crystal" as well as of the "Kingdom of Furniture". Växjö Linnaeus Science Park focuses on supporting entrepreneurs focusing on circular economy, smart city, forestry and digitalization.

Education
The city has three municipality-run secondary schools ("gymnasiums"): Teknikum, Katedralskolan, and Kungsmadskolan. Linnaeus University had a student body of 42,000 students  (including its Kalmar campus) or 15,000 students (full-time equivalents) .

Demography

Population numbers by city districts 
 Teleborg: 12,834
 Hovshaga: 9,541
 Hov: 8,020
 Araby: 6,520
 Norr: 4,518
 Väster: 4,829
 Öster: 4,489 
 Söder: 3,694 
 Sandsbro: 3,090
 Högstorp: 2,710
 Öjaby: 2,213
 Centrum: 2,086
 Räppe: 1,260
 Kronoberg/Evedal: 279
 Regementstaden: 88
 Västra mark: 69
 Norremark: 29

Transport 
The Coast to Coast track cuts through the municipality from north-west to south-east. SJ's long-distance trains travel between Gothenburg, Alvesta (with connections to the southern trunk line) and Kalmar, with stop in Växjö. Öresundståg's long-distance trains travel the Kalmar – Alvesta – Malmö - Copenhagen route. Regional trains Krösatågen travel the Växjö – Jönköping route. Trunk roads 23, 25, 27, 29, 30 and 37 meet in the municipality.

In air transport, the city is served by the nearby Växjö/Kronoberg Airport.

Environmental policy 
In 1996 the city adopted a policy for the elimination of the use of fossil fuels by 2030. This decision was taken in reaction to pollution and eutrophication in the lakes that surround the town. Greenhouse gas emissions were cut by 41% from 1993 to 2011, and were reduced by 55% by 2015. The city's economy has grown during this time.

By 2014, Växjö's CO2 emissions had dropped to 2.4tonnes per capita, well below the EU average of 7.3tonnes.

The Greenest City in Europe 
Växjö has called itself "The Greenest City in Europe" since 2007. It has its foundation in a long history of commitment to environmental issues, and ambitious goals for a green future. It is a vision shared with the citizens and the local companies.

In 2017 Växjö was awarded the European Green Leaf Award 2018 by the European Commission. The prize is awarded to cities with less than 100 000 inhabitants that show good results and ambitions in terms of environment and are committed to generate green growth.

Notable people 

 Joachim Björklund, footballer
 Jonas Björkman, tennis player with 50 doubles titles including Grand Slams
 Karl-Birger Blomdahl, 20th century music composer
 Maria Cederschiöld (deaconess)
 Bjorn Englen, bass player of Yngwie Malmsteen's Rising Force
 Knute Heldner, 20th-century Swedish American artist
 Emil Johansson (ice hockey), Ice Hockey player for the Providence Bruins of the AHL
 Stefan Johansson, Formula 1 racing driver
 Jonas Jonasson, writer
 Owe Jonsson, track and field athlete and European champion
 Martin Kellerman, comic strip creator
 Carolina Klüft, track and field athlete and Olympic gold medalist at Athens 2004
 Pär Lagerkvist, author and winner of the Nobel Prize in Literature, 1951
 Otto Lindblad, 19th century music composer
 Carl Linnaeus, botanist, physician and zoologist
 Melody Club, rock band
 Christina Nilsson, 19th century soprano celebrity
 Andreas Ravelli, footballer
 Thomas Ravelli, football goalkeeper
 Sophie Sager, 19th century writer and feminist
 Peder Sjögren, 20th century author and playwright
 Jonas Swensson, President of the Augustana Evangelical Lutheran Church
 Håkan Syrén, a military General and Supreme Commander of the Swedish Armed Forces
 Esaias Tegnér, poet and bishop of Växjö
 Mats Wilander, tennis player with seven Grand Slam victories 1982–1988
 Björn Wirdheim, racing driver
 The Ark, rock band

Sports clubs 
The following sports clubs are located in Växjö:
 Östers IF – football
 Hovshaga AIF – football, floorball, and tennis
 Växjö BK – football
 Växjö Lakers – ice hockey
 Växjö Vipers – floorball
 Wexjö RK – rugby
 Växjö Ravens BBK - basketball 
  – orienteering
 Växjö DFF – football
 Växjö United FC – football
Växjö VK – Volleyball

Climate 
Växjö has a humid continental climate (Dfb), using temperature data from 1961 to 1990. Temperatures have risen in recent years, and using the -3 Celsius isotherm, it can also be classified as an oceanic climate (Cfb) with 2002-2015 temperature data. It is milder, wetter, and cloudier than the rest of the country, with the number of hours of sunshine being associated more with the British Isles than with areas further north in Sweden. Considering its relative distance to all three coasts surrounding South Sweden, the climate is markedly maritime, with winter temperatures being relatively mild for an inland location. When compared with sunnier inland areas further north, Växjö has relatively cool summers.

References

External links 

Växjö Municipality – Official site
Växjö tourist information in english
Växjö article in Nordisk familjebok

 
County seats in Sweden
Populated lakeshore places in Sweden
Populated places in Kronoberg County
Populated places in Växjö Municipality
Municipal seats of Kronoberg County
Swedish municipal seats
Cities in Kronoberg County
Värend